Tanasak Srisai (born September 25, 1989), simply known as Bee, is a Thai professional footballer who plays as a centre-back for Thai League 1 club Chiangrai United.

Club career

Tanasak's form with TOT S.C. is impressive and is one of the main players on the team, therefore Buriram United bought him in 2013. At the start of the 2013 season he played well and became the starter of the team for a couple times. He scored his first Buriram goal against Chonburi FC in 2013.

International career 

He was called up by Winfried Schäfer to the 2012 King's Cup. On March 6, 2014, he debuted for Thailand against Lebanon in the 2015 AFC Asian Cup qualification.

International

Honours

Club
Buriram United
 Thai League 1: 2013, 2014
 Thai FA Cup: 2013
 Thai League Cup: 2013
 Toyota Premier Cup: 2014
 Kor Royal Cup: 2013, 2014

Ubon UMT United
 Thai League 4: 2015

Chiangrai United
 Thai League 1: 2019
 Thai FA Cup: 2018, 2020–21
 Thai League Cup: 2018
 Thailand Champions Cup: 2018,  2020

References

External links
 
 
 
 Profile at Goal

1989 births
Living people
Tanasak Srisai
Tanasak Srisai
Association football central defenders
Tanasak Srisai
Tanasak Srisai
Tanasak Srisai
Tanasak Srisai
Tanasak Srisai
Tanasak Srisai
Tanasak Srisai